

Maximilian Wengler (14 January 1890 – 25 April 1945) was a German general in the Wehrmacht during World War II. He was a recipient of the Knight's Cross of the Iron Cross with Oak Leaves and Swords of Nazi Germany.

Wengler took command of the 83rd Infantry Division on 27 March 1945 in the area of Gotenhafen. The division, after escaping the encirclement of the city, fought its way to Oxhöfter Kämpe and Pillau-Neutief, where Wengler and members of his staff were killed by an aerial bomb on 25 April 1945.

Awards
 Infantry Assault Badge in Silver
 Close Combat Clasp in Bronze
 Military Order of St. Henry (Knights Cross, 15 October 1914)

 Clasp to the Iron Cross (1939) 2nd Class (20 May 1940) & 1st Class (29 December 1940)
 Knight's Cross of the Iron Cross with Oak Leaves and Swords
 Knight's Cross on 6 October 1942 as Oberstleutnant of the Reserves and commander of Infanterie-Regiment 366
 Oak Leaves on 22 February 1944 as Oberst of the Reserves and commander of Infanterie-Regiment 366.
 Swords on 21 January 1945 as Generalmajor of the Reserves and commander of the 227. Infanterie-Division

References

Citations

Bibliography

 
 
 

1890 births
1945 deaths
Major generals of the German Army (Wehrmacht)
German Army personnel killed in World War II
Deaths by airstrike during World War II
Recipients of the Knight's Cross of the Iron Cross with Oak Leaves and Swords
Recipients of the clasp to the Iron Cross, 1st class
Military personnel from Saxony
People from Mittelsachsen
German Army personnel of World War I
German Army generals of World War II